The Banterer-class sailing sixth rates were a series of six 22-gun post ships built to an 1805 design by Sir William Rule, which served in the Royal Navy during the Napoleonic War. The first four were launched in 1806 and the remaining two in 1807. One ship – the Banterer – was lost in 1808 and another – the Cyane – captured by the United States Navy in 1815; the remaining four were all deleted during 1816.

Ships in class
 
 Builder: Simon Temple, South Shields
 Ordered: 30 January 1805
 Laid down: June 1805
 Launched: 19 April 1806
 Completed: 10 August 1806 at Chatham Dockyard
 Fate: Broken up at Portsmouth in October 1816.
 
 Builder: Robert Davy, Topsham, Exeter
 Ordered: 30 January 1805
 Laid down: July 1805
 Launched: 2 July 1806
 Completed: 4 October 1806 at Plymouth Dockyard
 Fate: Sold to be broken up at Deptford in February 1816, but became mercantile Daphne; last listed in 1823
 
 Builder: Simon Temple, South Shields
 Ordered: 30 January 1805
 Laid down: July 1805
 Launched: 24 December 1806
 Completed: 2 July 1807 at Chatham Dockyard
 Fate: Broken up at Portsmouth in June 1816.
 
 Builder: John Bass, Topsham, Exeter
 Ordered: 30 January 1805
 Laid down: August 1805
 Launched: 14 October 1806
 Completed: 13 July 1807 at Plymouth Dockyard
 Fate: Captured by USS Constitution off Madeira on 20 February 1815.
 
 Builder: Simon Temple, South Shields
 Ordered: 30 January 1805
 Laid down: August 1805
 Launched: 24 February 1807
 Completed: 12 July 1807 at Chatham Dockyard
 Fate: Wrecked in the Saint Lawrence River in October 1808.
 
 Builder: Thomas Owen, Topsham, Exeter
 Ordered: 30 January 1805
 Laid down: September 1805
 Launched: 26 January 1807
 Completed: 22 June 1807 at Plymouth Dockyard
 Fate: Sold to be broken up at Portsmouth in April 1816.

References

 Rif Winfield, British Warships in the Age of Sail, 1793-1817, Chatham Publishing, London 2005.

 
Ship classes